Taylor Logan Bailey (born February 27, 1997) is an American soccer player who currently plays for Oakland Roots in the USL Championship.

Career

Early career 
Bailey was a three-sport athlete at Greeneville High School, playing soccer, basketball, and football. During his senior season, he played as both a forward and a goalkeeper, scoring 24 goals and recording nine assists as a forward and making 110 saves and 12 shutouts as a keeper. Bailey was named first-team All-District and the District MVP, and was named All-State as both a goalkeeper and a forward. Bailey also played club soccer for Greeneville Galaxy, FC Dallas-Tri, and  FC Alliance. Bailey was selected to the Tennessee Olympic Development Program team and went on to be a starting keeper for the U.S. Region III squad.

College 
In 2015, Bailey attended Nova Southeastern University to play college soccer. In his freshman season, Bailey made 13 appearances for the Sharks. In 2017, he also played one season at City College of San Francisco, making 19 appearances and, as team Captain, won First-team All Conference accolades and made the All Western Region team, as recognized by the United Soccer Coaches Association.

As well as college soccer, Bailey played in the USL PDL, appearing for Tri-Cities Otters in 2016, and San Francisco City in 2017 and 2018.

Professional 
In their 2020 season, Bailey signed with NISA side Oakland Roots, going on to make two appearances for the club in their Spring Season. He re-signed with the club on April 20, 2021, following their move to the USL Championship.

Personal life 
Bailey is an animal advocate who was trained as a therapy dog handler by Therapy Dogs International.  He has worked with exotic animals and with over 280 big cats, including tigers, lions, leopards, cougars, and jaguars at Tiger Haven, a big cat sanctuary and rescue facility in East Tennessee.

References

External links 
 Taylor Bailey at Nova Southeastern

1997 births
American soccer players
Association football goalkeepers
Forward Madison FC players
Living people
National Independent Soccer Association players
Nova Southeastern Sharks men's soccer players
Oakland Roots SC players
People from Greeneville, Tennessee
San Francisco City FC players
Soccer players from Tennessee
USL Championship players
USL League Two players
City College of San Francisco alumni